Dream Whip is a brand of whipped topping mix that is mixed with milk and vanilla to make a whipped dessert topping, currently owned by the Kraft Heinz company.

Dream Whip was developed and released by the General Foods Corporation in 1957, as one of its convenience products that flooded the market by that time.

General Foods would be eventually bought by Philip Morris USA in 1985, and ended up generally being absorbed by Kraft Foods Inc.

See also

 Cool Whip
Whipped cream
 List of dessert sauces

Further reading
 Sweet Endings from Dream Whip Whipped Topping Mix - Google Books

References

External links
 

Products introduced in 1957
Dessert sauces
Brand name desserts
Milk substitutes
Kraft Foods brands